This is a list of senators from the state of Tasmania since Australian Federation in 1901.

List

Senators, Tasmania